Niamina East is one of the ten districts of the Central River Division of the Gambia. Its population in the 2013 census was 24,571.

References 

Central River Division
Districts of the Gambia